This is a list of United States military helicopters

Helicopters

See also
U.S. DoD aircraft designations table
List of military aircraft of the United States

Notes

The U.S. Air Force (USAF) did not exist until September 1947.  Therefore the Sikorski R4 of 1942 "notes" indicate USAF.  Possibly it was meant to be USAAF (U.S. Army Air Force).

References

Bibliography
 
  Philippe Poulet et Frédéric Ogeret, La fabuleuse histoire de l'hélicoptère, Éditions Mission Spéciale, 2007, 312 p. 
  Ouvrage collectif, L'Atlas des hélicoptères, Éditions Atlas, Éditions Glénat, 2002, 240 p.

External links
 2012 Gallery of USAF Weapons includes numbers and types of USAF aircraft
 United States Navy Fact File page includes links to Fact File pages for USN manned and unmanned aircraft.
 United States Army 2010 Weapons System Handbook (PDF file, 41.6 mb) includes pages describing USA manned and unmanned aircraft.
 United States Coast Guard Aircraft and Cutters page includes links to descriptive pages for USCG manned and unmanned aircraft.

United States military helicopters, List of
helicopters